Konystanu, also known as Qonystanu, (Qonystanu, قونىستانۋ; , Konystanu) is a town in Atyrau Region, west Kazakhstan.

References

Atyrau Region
Cities and towns in Kazakhstan